Firuzabad (also Romanized as Fīrūzābād) is a village in Jolgeh Rural District Rural District, Shahrabad District, Bardaskan County, Razavi Khorasan Province, Iran. At the 2006 census, its population was 661, in 195 families.

References 

Populated places in Bardaskan County